Declared historic buildings of Hangzhou are districts, artifacts or buildings legally declared to be "protected". According to the "Regularations of historic districts and historic buildings in Hangzhou" effectivated from 1 January 2005, historic buildings are those artifacts or districts that have lasted more than 50 years, and of significant values for history, science, and art study. In Hangzhou, declaring a historic house requires consulting the urban planning administration bureau, and the real estate administration bureau.

As of 31 June 2011, there are 287 declared historic buildings in Hangzhou, proclaimed as 5 batches.[17] In the near future, it is going to issue the sixth batch which includes 51 historic houses.

List of fourth batch of declared historic buildings in Hangzhou
52 buildings were declared to be the fourths batch of historic houses in Hang Zhou, in August 2008. The following information is provided by Real Estate Admiustration Bureau & Research Institute for Historic buildings in Hang zhou.

References: 

Buildings and structures in Hangzhou